Anne Jervois Gilliland (born 1959) is an archivist, scholar, and professor in the field of archival studies. She is Associate Dean for Information Studies at the University of California, Los Angeles Graduate School of Education & Information Studies.

Education 
Gilliland grew up in Northern Ireland. She holds an M.A. in English Literature (Old Norse and Anglo-Irish Literature concentrations) from Trinity College Dublin; an M.S. in Library and Information Studies from the University of Illinois at Urbana-Champaign; and a Ph.D. in Information and Library Studies from the University of Michigan.

Career 
Since 1995, Gilliland has held various positions within UCLA's Department of Information Studies. She began at UCLA as an assistant professor. She became a full Professor in 2005. She served as chair of the department between 2005 and 2009, and became the inaugural Associate Dean for Information Studies in 2018.

Along with Michelle Caswell and Marika Cifor, Gilliland is credited with introducing concepts of affect, imagined and impossible records into the field of archival theory, and having significantly influenced the trajectory of the field with this work. She has also collaborated widely with Australian archival scholar Sue McKemmish, particularly on the topics of rights in records, co-creatorship, and Indigenous peoples' claims to their own records. Gilliland is the Director of the Center for Information as Evidence, and established the Refugee Rights in Records Initiative.

She was a founding faculty member of the Archival Education and Research Institute (AERI).

Awards and honors 
 Harold A. and Lois Haytin Faculty Award from the UCLA Graduate School of Education & Information Studies (2012)
 C.F.W. Coker Award from the Encoded Archival Description Working Group of the Society of American Archivists, (1998) 
 Margaret Cross Norton Award, from the Midwest Archives Conference (1997)
 Honorary Professorial Research Fellow at the Humanities Advanced Technology and Information Institute of the University of Glasgow, 2002–03
 Fellow of the Society of American Archivists

Bibliography 
 Willer, Mirna, Anne J. Gilliland, and Marijana Tomic, eds, Authenticity, Provenance, Authority and Evidence: Selected Papers from the Conference and School on Authenticity, Provenance, Authority and Evidence, University of Zadar, Croatia, October 2016, (Zadar: University of Zadar Press, 2018).
 Gilliland, Anne J., Sue McKemmish and Andrew J Lau, eds. Research in the Archival Multiverse (Social Informatics Monograph Series, Monash University Press, 2016), http://www.publishing.monash.edu/books/ram-9781876924676.html.
 Gilliland, Anne J. Conceptualizing Twenty-first-century Archives (Chicago, IL: Society of American Archivists, 2014).
 Willer, Mirna, Anne J. Gilliland, and Marijana Tomic, eds, Records, Archives and Memory: Selected Papers from the Conference and School on Records, Archives and Memory Studies, University of Zadar, Croatia, May 2013, (Zadar: University of Zadar Press, 2015).
 Gilliland, Anne and Sue McKemmish, eds. Nuevos métjodos de investigación en archivística, Cartagena, Spain: Tendencias monograph series, 2007 (translation of guest edited double issue of Archival Science on Building a Research Infrastructure for Archival Science).
 Gilliland-Swetland, Anne J. Enduring Paradigm, New Opportunities: The Value of the Archival Perspective in the Digital Environment (Washington, D.C.: Council on Library and Information Resources, 2000).

References 

1959 births
Living people
Female archivists
Fellows of the Society of American Archivists
UCLA Graduate School of Education and Information Studies faculty
Alumni of Trinity College Dublin
University of Illinois Urbana-Champaign alumni
University of Michigan School of Information alumni